Margaret Holford (1757–1834, sometimes known as "the elder") was an English novelist, playwright, and poet of the late 18th century. Both she and her daughter, likewise Margaret Holford, were accomplished authors.

Life and family
Born Margaret Wrench in Chester in 1757, she married Allen Holford of nearby Davenham. She died in Chester in November 1834.

Holford's daughter, likewise Margaret Holford (1778–1852), was also an accomplished author. Their works are said to be "often confused in catalogues and dictionary entries."

Works
Fanny: A Novel: In a Series of Letters, 1785 (anonymously)
Gresford Vale; and Other Poems, 1798
"The Way to Win Her" (five-act play), in The New British Theatre, 1814

References

1757 births
1834 deaths
18th-century British novelists
18th-century British women writers
18th-century British writers
18th-century British poets
19th-century British women writers
19th-century British writers
19th-century British novelists
British women poets
British women novelists
People from Chester